Julius Ferdinand Ruska (9 February 1867, Bühl, Baden – 11 February 1949, Schramberg) was a German orientalist, historian of science and educator.

He was a critical scholar of alchemical literature, and of Islamic science, raising many issues on attributions and sources of the texts, and providing translations. The range of his studies was wide, including the Emerald Tablet, a basic hermetic text. From 1924 he headed an institute in Heidelberg, where he has been a student.

Of his seven children, Ernst Ruska and Helmut Ruska were distinguished in their fields.

Books

Sources

External links 

  Comprehensive biographical and bibliographical site

1867 births
1949 deaths
People from Bühl (Baden)
People from the Grand Duchy of Baden
German scholars
Historians of science
German orientalists
German male non-fiction writers
Academic staff of the Humboldt University of Berlin